Jan Happy Pieterse (28 May 1942 – 26 May 2013 in Alberton, Gauteng, South Africa) was a South African boxer. His professional record includes 22 fights: 17 wins, and 5 losses (3 knockouts).

He died on 26 May 2013, two days before his 71st birthday.

Career

In 1963, Pieterse won the light-middleweight title at the South African amateur championships, before turning professional in July 1965 and stopping Boet de Bruyn in the fourth round.

His last fight was in February 1970 against Sarel Aucamp, to whom he lost the national title.

References

External links
Profile at Boxrec

2013 deaths
Light-heavyweight boxers
1942 births
Deaths from diabetes
People from Alberton, Gauteng
South African male boxers
Sportspeople from Gauteng